Livewire(s), Live Wire(s), The Live Wire or Live Wired may refer to:
 Live wire (electricity), a wire with a flow of electrical current

Computers
 Livewire (networking), a digital audio networking technology
 LiveWire Professional, computer software for stock market analysis
 Livewire Segmentation Technique, an image segmentation technique
 LiveWire, a server-side JavaScript environment by Netscape

Entertainment

Comics
 Live Wire (comics), several comics-related characters and series including:
 Live Wire (DC Comics) or Garth Ranzz, more commonly known as Lightning Lad, a member of the Legion of Super-Heroes
 Live Wire (Marvel Comics), a supervillain in the Marvel Comics universe
 Livewire (DC Comics), a former supervillainess, now ally of Superman
 Livewire (Valiant Comics) or Amanda McKee, a superhero in the Valiant Comics Universe
 Livewires (comics), a Marvel Comics series

Film
 The Live Wire (1917 film), a British lost silent film starring Ronald Colman
 The Live Wire (1925 film), an American silent film starring Johnny Hines
 The Live Wire (1935 film), an American film directed by Harry S. Webb
 The Live Wire (1937 film), a UK film directed by Herbert Brenon
 Live Wire (film), a 1992 film starring Pierce Brosnan
 Live Wires (1921 film), American silent drama film 
 Live Wires (1946 film), a 1946 film starring The Bowery Boys

TV and radio 
 Live Wire Radio, a syndicated live radio variety show, Portland, Oregon
 Livewire (radio station), a student-run radio station at University of East Anglia, Norwich, UK
 "Livewire" (Superman: The Animated Series), an episode of Superman: The Animated Series
 "Livewire" (Supergirl), an episode of the CBS television series Supergirl
 Livewire (talk show), a 1980s teen talk show on Nickelodeon
 Livewire (Wellington), the radio station run by Wellington High School
 WWF LiveWire, a World Wrestling Federation TV series, 1996 to 2001

Music
 Live Wire (album), a 2004 album by Third Day
 Live Wire (Lowen & Navarro album)
 Live Wire (Maren Morris album), 2011
 The Live Wire: Woody Guthrie in Performance 1949, an album
 Live Wired, a 1996 album by Front Line Assembly
 Live Wires (album), a 1992 album by Yellowjackets
 "Live Wire" (Martha and the Vandellas song), 1964
 "Live Wire" (Mötley Crüe song), 1981
 "Live Wire", a song from T.N.T. by AC/DC
 "Live Wire", a song from Seotaiji 7th Issue by Seo Taiji
 "Livewire", a 2015 song from the album Oh Wonder by Oh Wonder
 "Live Wires", a 2004 album by Stratospheerius

Literature
 Live Wire (novel), a 2011 novel by Harlan Coben
 The Live Wire (magazine), a short-lived 1908 pulp magazine
 Livewire (magazine), rock music magazine 1991–1997
 Livewired  (book) (Livewired: The Inside Story of the Ever-Changing Brain), a neuroscience book by David Eagleman

Other entertainment
 Live Wire, an art installation by Natalie Jeremijenko
 Live Wire!, a game developed by Square Enix Europe (SCI/Eidos)
 LiveWire Chicago Theatre, a non-profit theater arts organization

People
 Stephen Maguire (born 1981), Scottish snooker player nicknamed "Livewire"
 Tim Shieff (born 1988), freerunner and traceur nicknamed "Livewire"

Other uses
 Harley-Davidson LiveWire, a motorcycle
 LiveWire (company), a spin off electric motorcycle company from Harley Davidson
 Mountain Dew LiveWire, a soft drink

See also 
 Live Wire/Blues Power, a 1968 album by Albert King